Kim or KIM may refer to:

Names
 Kim (given name)
 Kim (surname)
 Kim (Korean surname)
 Kim dynasty (disambiguation), several dynasties
 Kim family (North Korea), the rulers of North Korea since Kim Il-sung in 1948
 Kim, Vietnamese form of Jin (Chinese surname)

Languages
 Kim language, a language of Chad
 Kim language (Sierra Leone), a language of Sierra Leone
 kim, the ISO 639 code of the Tofa language of Russia

Media
 Kim (album), a 2009 album by Kim Fransson
 "Kim" (song), 2000 song by Eminem
 "Kim", a song by Tkay Maidza, 2021
 Kim (novel), by Rudyard Kipling
 Kim (1950 film), an American adventure film based on the novel
 Kim (1984 film), a British film based on the novel
 "Kim" (M*A*S*H), a 1973 episode of the American television show M*A*S*H
 Kim (magazine), defunct Turkish women's magazine (1992–1999)

Organizations
 Kenya Independence Movement, a defunct political party in Kenya
 Khalifa Islamiyah Mindanao, Filipino terrorist organization
 Kingdom Identity Ministries, a Christian organisation

Places
 , a village in Touboro, Cameroon
 Kim, Chad, a place in Chad
 Kim, Gujarat, a town in India
 Kim, Republic of Bashkortostan, a village in Russia
 Kim, Tajikistan, a town in Tajikistan
 Kim, Colorado, a town in the United States
 Camp Kim, a military facility in South Korea
 Kimberley Airport, IATA code KIM, an airport in South Africa
 Kosovo and Metohija (Serbian: , KiM), a province in Serbia

Other uses
 Kim people, an ethnic group of Chad
 Kim (cigarette), a German brand
 Kim (food), Korean seaweed
 Tropical Storm Kim, eight tropical Pacific Ocean cyclones
 .kim, top-level internet domain
 KIM-1, a microcomputer

See also
 Kim's Game, a game or exercise
 Kem (disambiguation)
 Khim, a stringed musical instrument
 KIMM (disambiguation)
 Kimm, a surname
 Kimberley (disambiguation)